The Joes River is a river of Barbados.

See also
List of rivers of Barbados

Rivers of Barbados